Furiosa may refer to:

 Imperator Furiosa, a character in Mad Max
 Furiosa, a prequel to Mad Max: Fury Road starring Anya Taylor-Joy
 Furiosa, a provisional name of the Alfa Romeo MiTo
 Phragmacossia furiosa (P. furiosa), a species of moth in the family Cossidae
 Cynaeda furiosa (C. furiosa), a species of moth in the family Crambidae
 "Furiosa", a song by Anitta from the F9 soundtrack

See also
 Furio (disambiguation)
 Furioso (disambiguation)
 Furious (disambiguation)
 Fury (disambiguation)